Lyagushino is a rural locality (a village) in Chernovskoye Rural Settlement, Bolshesosnovsky District, Perm Krai, Russia. The population was 21 as of 2010. There is 1 street.

Geography 
Lyagushino is located 29 km south of Bolshaya Sosnova (the district's administrative centre) by road. Osinovka is the nearest rural locality.

References 

Rural localities in Bolshesosnovsky District